Christopher Savery (by 1502 – 18 April 1560), of Totnes, Devon, was an English politician.

He was a Member (MP) of the Parliament of England for Totnes in March 1553, October 1553 and November 1554. He was Mayor of Totnes in 1535–1537, 1548–49 and 1556–57.

References

1560 deaths
Members of the Parliament of England (pre-1707) for Totnes
English MPs 1553 (Edward VI)
English MPs 1553 (Mary I)
English MPs 1554–1555
Mayors of Totnes
Year of birth uncertain